Antoine Henri Grouvelle (17 January 1843 – 9 June 1917 Neuilly-sur-Seine) was  a French entomologist who specialised in Coleoptera.
He was also an engineer who directed a tobacco factory.
He worked on world fauna of the heterogeneous group of beetles known as Clavicornia. Grouvelle was a Member of the Société entomologique de France

Selected works
Viaggio di Leonardo Fea in Birmania e regioni vicine. L. Nitidulides, Cucujides et Parnides. Annali del Museo Civico di Storia Naturale de Genova, 32: 813-868.(1892)
Potamophilides, Dryopides, Helmides et Heterocerides des Indes orientales. Annali del Museo Civico di Storia Naturale de Genova, Serie 2, 17(37): 1-25.(1896)
Nitidulides, Colydiides, Cucujides et Parnides récoltés par M. E. Gounelle au Brésil et autres Clavicornes nouveaux d' Amerique. Annales de la Société Entomologique de France, 65: 177-216.(1896)
 with Achille Raffray Supplément à la Liste des Coléoptères de la Guadeloupe Ann. Soc. Entom. France vol. 81 (1912)
 Wissenschaftliche Ergebnisse der schwedischen zoologischen Expedition nach dem Kilimandjaro, dem Meru und dem umgebenden Massaisteppen. Coleoptera. Clavicornes.(1909)
Études sur les Coléoptères (premier & deuxième fascicule)(various works on "Clavicornes" bound together) (1916–1918).

References
Constantin, R. 1992 Memorial des Coléopteristes Français. Bull. liaison Assoc. Col. reg. parisienne, Paris (Suppl. 14) : 1-92 42
Lhoste, J. 1987 Les entomologistes français. 1750 - 1950.  INRA (Institut National de la Recherche Agronomique), Paris : 1-355 85-86
Musgrave, A. 1932: Bibliography of Australian Entomology 1775 - 1930. Sydney 131-132

External links
Dryopidae bibliography

1843 births
1917 deaths
French entomologists
Presidents of the Société entomologique de France